Self-portrait as Zeuxis Laughing is one of over 40 painted self-portraits by Rembrandt.  Painted around 1662 by the Dutch artist Rembrandt, it is now in the Wallraf-Richartz-Museum in Cologne.

Notes

Bibliography 
 Ekkehard Mai: Rembrandt Selbstbildnis als Zeuxis. Gebr. Mann Verlag, Berlin 2002; 
 Jürgen Müller: Rembrandt Harmensz van Rijn: Selbstbildnis als Zeuxis, 1663. In: Ulrich Pfisterer, Valeska von Rosen: Der Künstler als Kunstwerk. Selbstporträts vom Mittelalter bis zur Gegenwart. Philipp Reclam jun., Stuttgart 2005, .
 Fritz Erpel: Die Selbstbildnisse Rembrandt Henschelverlag, Berlin 1967

Self-portraits by Rembrandt
1663 paintings
Collections of the Wallraf–Richartz Museum